Back Home Again is the twenty-fourth studio album by the country music superstar Kenny Rogers.

Overview 
Back Home Again is the last of Rogers' albums with Reprise Records and is the beginning of his movement between various labels, including his own label, Dreamcatcher Records, in the years to come.

Of the Reprise albums, this had the worst chart showing. It only reached number 42 on the U.S. Country charts and is Rogers' second consecutive album not to attain any certifications from the RIAA.

Rogers left Reprise after this record's run, though he did remain with the parent company WEA at their Giant Records division.

Track listing

Personnel 
Compiled from liner notes.

Musicians
 Kenny Rogers – lead vocals
 Mike Lawler – synthesizers
 Phil Naish – keyboards, synthesizers, string arrangements
 Bobby Ogdin –  acoustic piano, keyboards
 Hargus "Pig" Robbins – acoustic piano
 Steve Gibson – electric guitar, acoustic guitar, mandolin, mandola
 John Hug – acoustic guitar
 Biff Watson – acoustic guitar
 Hoot Hester – mandolin, mandola, fiddle
 Dan Dugmore – pedal steel guitar
 Sonny Garrish – pedal steel guitar
 Jay Dee Maness – pedal steel guitar
 Michael Rhodes – bass guitar
 Eddie Bayers – drums
 Paul Leim – drums
 Billy Thomas – drums
 Terry McMillan – harmonica, percussion
 Farrell Morris – marimba
 Eric Prestidge – string arrangements
 Bergen White – arrangements, conductor
 Carl Gorodetzky – concertmaster, contractor
 The Nashville String Machine – strings
 Steve Glassmeyer – backing vocals
 Gene Golden – backing vocals
 Chris Harris – backing vocals
 Mark Heimermann – backing vocals
 Gary Janney – backing vocals
 Dennis Locorriere – harmony vocals

Guest vocalists
 The Branson Brothers (tracks 1, 4)
 Linda Davis (tracks 1, 2, 5)
 Rudy and Steve Gatlin of Larry Gatlin and the Gatlin Brothers (track 8)
 Terry McBride and Billy Thomas of McBride & the Ride (track 10)
 Larry Stewart of Restless Heart (track 6)

Production 
 Producers – Jim Ed Norman and Eric Prestidge
 Recorded by Mark Dewey, John Dickson, Mark Kapps, Eric Prestidge and Robert Tassi.
 Recorded at The Loft (Nashville, TN), The Castle (Franklin, TN) and Ocean Way Recording (Hollywood, CA).
 Mixed by Eric Prestidge at Conway Studios  (Hollywood, CA).
 Edited by Don Cobb
 Technicians – Mark Goddington, Danny Kee, Mark Nevers, Rail Rogut, Brett Swain and Robert Tassi.
 Mastered by Doug Sax and Alan Yoshida at The Mastering Lab (Los Angeles, CA).
 Art Direction – Laura LiPuma Nash
 Design – Beth Middleworth
 Photography – Peter LiPuma Nash

Chart performance

Singles 
The first single released from this album was "If You Want To Find Love", which reached #11 in the U.S. and  #12 in Canada. Two other singles, "Someone Must Feel Like A Fool Tonight" and "I'll Be There For You", did not chart.

References 

Kenny Rogers albums
1991 albums
Reprise Records albums
Albums produced by Jim Ed Norman